Vicky Chase may refer to:
	
 Vicky Chassioti, German singer and member of the pop group Cherona
Victoria Chase, fictional character of the sitcom Hot in Cleveland